This is part of a list of Statutes of New Zealand for the period of the First National Government of New Zealand up to and including part of the first year of the Second Labour Government of New Zealand.

1950s

1950  

 Auckland Harbour Trust Act 
 Balclutha Borough Vesting and Empowering Act 
 Boilers, Lifts, and Cranes Act  Amended: 1966/69/71/80/88
 Capital Punishment Act 
 Co-operative Egg Marketing Companies Act 
 Crown Proceedings Act  Amended: 1958/62/69/74/82/88
 Dietitians Act  Amended: 1955/64/65/70/73/79/82/94/99/2001
 Emergency Forces Act  Amended: 1951
 Huntly Borough Empowering Act 
 Hutt Valley Electric Board Empowering Act 
 Joint Family Homes Act  Amended: 1951/52/55/57/59/60/65/68/71/72/74
 Legislative Council Abolition Act 
 Limitation Act  Amended: 1962/63/70/96
 Machinery Act  Amended: 1956/61/63/65/68/69/70/71/72/74/76/77/78/79/81/86/89
 Marginal Lands Act  Amended: 1958/62/65/69/70/77
 Medical Research Council Act  Amended: 1951/56/65/81/86/87
 Napier City Special Rates Consolidation Act 
 Nelson City Special Rates Consolidation Act 
 New Zealand Army Act  Amended: 1954/57/59/60/61/62/63/65/67/69/76/81
 Palmerston North City Gasworks and Electricity Empowering Act 
 Potato Growing Industry Act  Amended: 1955/60/62/70
 Republic of India Act 
 Republic of Ireland Act 
 Royal New Zealand Air Force Act  Amended: 1954/57/59/60/61/62/63/65/67/68/76/80/81
 Servicemen's Settlement Act  Amended: 1951
 Taupiri and Renown Coal Companies Act 
 Waterfront Royal Commission Act 
 Wool Proceeds Retention Act  Amended: 1951/64
Plus 61 Acts amended

1951  

 Air Services Licensing Act  Amended: 1952/55/58/60/65/67/72/73/74/78/86
 Eliza White Orphanage Trust Act 
 Enemy Property Act 
 Fees and Travelling Allowances Act  Amended: 1987
 John Fuller Trust Act 
 Lower Hutt City Empowering Act 
 Lyttelton Borough Gasworks and Electricity Empowering Act 
 Lyttelton Harbour Board Empowering Act 
 North Shore Drainage Act  Amended: 1954/56/66/67/68/69/71/83
 Oamaru Borough Council and Oamaru Harbour Board Empowering Act 
 Oamaru Harbour Board Rating Act 
 Official Secrets Act 
 Palmerston North Town Planning Empowering Act 
 Peggy Joan Boys Voluntary Settlement Act 
 Roman Catholic Bishops Empowering Act  Amended: 1970
 Te Kuiti Borough Empowering Act 
 Union Funds Distribution Act  Amended: 1965
 Wool Commission Act  Amended: 1952/54/61/64/67/68
Plus 70 Acts amended

1952  

 Amusement Tax Act  Amended: 1953/56/63
 Auckland Trades Hall Trust Act 
 Bay of Islands Harbour Board Empowering Act  Amended: 1953
 Bluff Borough Council and Bluff Harbour Board Empowering Act 
 Bluff Harbour Improvement Act 
 City of Dunedin Leasing Empowering Act 
 Diplomatic Immunities Act 
 Electricians Act  Amended: 1956/59/60/63/66/67/69/75/76
 Geothermal Steam Act 
 Greymouth Borough Special Rates Consolidation Act 
 Hamilton City Gasworks and Electricity Empowering Act 
 Hutt Valley and Bays Metropolitan Milk Board Validation Act 
 Inland Revenue Department Act  Amended: 1958/60/61/66/76/78/79/80/86/88/89/90/91/92/93/94
 Land Settlement Promotion Act  Amended: 1955/59/61/63
 Lyttelton Harbour Board Loan and Empowering Act 
 Manawatu Catchment Board Empowering Act 
 National Parks Act  Amended: 1955/56/58/64/65/67/68/70/71/72/73/74/76/77/82/88/94/96/2001/05
 New Lynn Borough Empowering and Rates Consolidation Act 
 New Plymouth City Empowering Act 
 Social Service Council of the Diocese of Christchurch Act 
 Summary Jurisdiction Act  Amended: 1955
 Tauranga County Council Empowering Act 
 Timaru City Rates Consolidation Act 
 Wellington Harbour Board Loan and Empowering Act 
 Western Waiheke Road Board Empowering Act 
 Whanganui College Board of Trustees Empowering Act 
Plus 59 Acts amended

1953  

 Auckland Hospital Board Trusts Empowering Act 
 Building Emergency Regulations Act  Amended: 1954/55/56
 Courts-Martial Appeals Act 
 Dairy Board Act  Amended: 1955/57/58/67/69/71/72/73/75/77/79/80/85/86/88/92/96/98
 Department of Agriculture Act  Amended: 1962/64
 Designs Act  Amended: 1972/76/96/99
 Emergency Forces Rehabilitation Act  Amended: 1971
 Geothermal Energy Act  Amended: 1957/66/69/73/77/80/88
 Kaikoura River Board Validating Act 
 Kamo Town Board Empowering Act 
 Kawerau and Murupara Townships Act 
 King George the Fifth Memorial Children's Health Camps Act  Amended: 1960
 Local Authorities' Emergency Powers Act 
 Local Elections And Polls Act 
 Maori Affairs Act  Amended: 1962/67/74/85/87/88/91
 Maori Trust Leases Renewal Act 
 Maori Trustee Act  Amended: 1962/79/85/91/96
 Motor Spirits Distribution Act  Amended: 1958/63/66/68/72/75/79/81
 National Roads Act  Amended: 1954/55/56/57/58/59/60/62/64/65/70/73/80/88
 New Zealand Government Property Corporation Act  Amended: 1967
 Offences at Sea Act 
 Orchard Levy Act  Amended: 1969/72/76/82/85/87/88
 Primary Products Marketing Regulations Confirmation Act 
 Reserves and Domains Act  Amended: 1955/56/57/58/60/63/64/65/66/67/68/69/70/71/72
 Royal New Zealand Institute of Horticulture Act  Amended: 1957/85
 Royal Powers Act 
 Selwyn Plantation Board Act  Amended: 1963/77/91
 Southland Catchment Board Empowering Act 
 Town and Country Planning Act  Amended: 1957/61/63/66/68/69/71/72/73/74/75/80/83/87/88
 Underground Water Act 
 Waterfront Industry Act  Amended: 1958/64/77/80/82/83/84/85
 Waters Pollution Act  Amended: 1962/70
 Wildlife Act  Amended: 1956/59/64/66/68/71/72/73/80/81/83/93/94/96/2003
Plus 86 Acts amended

1954  

 Criminal Justice Act  Amended: 1955/60/61/62/63/65/66/67/69/70/75/76/78/80/81/83/85/86/87/88/89/93/94/95/96/97/98/99/2001
 Dargaville Borough Empowering Act 
 Defamation Act  Amended: 1958/71/74
 Historic Places Act  Amended: 1957/63/64/67/69/70/72/75/76/82/85/88/93/98/2006
 Kaitaia Borough Empowering Act 
 Maori Vested Lands Administration Act 
 McKenzie Trusts Act 
 Merchandise Marks Act 
 Navy Act  Amended: 1958/62/67/76
 Offenders Legal Aid Act  Amended: 1989
 Onerahi Town Board Empowering Act 
 Papatoetoe Borough Special Rates Consolidation Act 
 Patea By-election Act 
 Penal Institutions Act  Amended: 1955/61/63/64/65/69/75/76/78/79/80/81/82/83/85/89/91/93/94/96/97/99
 Raglan Harbour Board Empowering Act 
 Taranaki Harbour Board Act 
 Tasman Pulp and Paper Company Enabling Act  Amended: 1986
 Taupo County Act  Amended: 1965
Plus 52 Acts amended

1955  

 Adoption Act  Amended: 1957/62/65/87/95/2000
 Ashburton Borough Cemetery Act 
 Chiropractors' Association Act 
 Co-operative Fertilizer Manufacturing Companies Act 
 Dogs Registration Act  Amended: 1937/61/62/65/68/69/73/76/77
 Eden Park Trust Act  Amended: 1970/79
 Electricity and Gas Co-ordination Committee Act 
 Estate and Gift Duties Act  Amended: 1957/58/59/60/61/62/63/64/65/66/68/69/70/71/72/74/76/77/78/79/80/81/82/83/86/87/89/90/92/93/94/95/96/2005
 Family Protection Act  Amended: 1921/59/67/91/2001
 Hamilton City Special Rates Consolidation Act 
 Hikurangi Town Council Empowering Act 
 Maori Reserved Land Act  Amended: 1997/98
 Maori Trust Boards Act  Amended: 1962/83/88/96
 Marriage Act 1955
 Mary Bryant Trust Board Enabling Act 
 Meat Export Prices Act  Amended: 1957/73/82
 Mutual Insurance Act  Amended: 1963/64/68/71/77/78/82/86
 New Zealand Foundation for the Blind Act  Amended: 1959
 Newspapers and Printers Act 
 Otago Museum Trust Board Act  Amended: 1968/73/78
 Palmerston North Insurance Funds Act 
 Rabbits Act  Amended: 1956/58/59/60/62/63/64
 Rawene Town Council Empowering Act 
 Statistics Act  Amended: 1978/82/85/86/88/94
 Taranaki Harbour Board Empowering Act  Amended: 1956/57
 Tourist Hotel Corporation Act  Amended: 1961/68/71/73/76/78/82/85
 Wellington Harbour Reclamation Act  Amended: 1969/83/86
Plus 77 Acts amended

1956  

 Awanui Harbour Board Empowering Act 
 Boy Scouts Association of New Zealand Act 
 Co-operative Companies Act  Amended: 1976/77/98/2004
 Contracts Enforcement Act 
 Electricity and Gas Co-ordination Act 
 Greytown Trust Lands Act 
 Industries and Commerce Act  Amended: 1969
 Local Authorities Loans Act  Amended: 1959/61/63/67/68/71/72/76/82/86/88/89/91
 Masonic Property Trusts Act 
 Northcote Borough Empowering Act 
 Noxious Animals Act  Amended: 1962/67
 Republic of Pakistan Act 
 Saint Mary's Guild Trust Act 
 Tauranga Harbour Board Loan and Empowering Act 
 Waikato Valley Authority Act  Amended: 1960/61/68/69/77
 Waitemata County Council Empowering Act 
Plus 80 Acts amended

1957  

 Archives Act  Amended: 1988
 Charitable Trusts Act  Amended: 1963/93/2007
 Church of Jesus Christ of Latter-day Saints Trust Board Empowering Act  Amended: 1968
 Diplomatic Immunities and Privileges Act 
 Federation of Malaya Act 
 Hastings City Special Rates Consolidation Act 
 Hospitals Act  Amended: 1948/50/51/53/56/61/62/64/66/67/68/70/71/72/73/75/76/77/78/80/81/82/83/86/88/89/93/96
 Income Tax Assessment Act 
 Maori Soldiers Trust Act  Amended: 2001
 Oaths and Declarations Act  Amended: 1963/65/72/96/98/99/2001/02
 Presbyterian Church Property Trustees Empowering Act 
 Rangiora Borough Empowering Act 
 Taranaki Scholarships Trust Board Act  Amended: 1961/62/66/69/80/82/87/93
 Valuation Equalisation Act 
 Vegetables Levy Act  Amended: 1960/72/75/78/80/81
 Whangarei Borough Special Rates Consolidation Act 
Plus 86 Acts amended

See also 
The above list may not be current and will contain errors and omissions. For more accurate information try:
 Walter Monro Wilson, The Practical Statutes of New Zealand, Auckland: Wayte and Batger 1867
 The Knowledge Basket: Legislation NZ
 New Zealand Legislation Includes some Imperial and Provincial Acts. Only includes Acts currently in force, and as amended.
 Legislation Direct List of statutes from 2003 to order

Lists of statutes of New Zealand